Anton Zakharov (born 13 February 1986) is a Ukrainian diver. He is competed for Ukraine at the 2004, 2008 and 2012 Summer Olympics.

Career
At the 2004 Summer Olympics he competed in both the men's individual 10 m platform diving and the synchronised 10 m platform diving, while at the 2008 and 2012 Summer Olympics he only competed in the individual events.  His best Olympic result was fourth in the synchronised diving with Roman Volodkov in 2004.

References

Ukrainian male divers
Divers at the 2004 Summer Olympics
Divers at the 2008 Summer Olympics
Divers at the 2012 Summer Olympics
Olympic divers of Ukraine
1986 births
Living people
Sportspeople from Zaporizhzhia
Universiade medalists in diving
Universiade bronze medalists for Ukraine
Medalists at the 2007 Summer Universiade